The North Washington Street Bridge is a historic bridge in DeWitt, Arkansas, USA. Built in 1910, it carries North Washington Street over Holt Branch, just south of Holt Lane, and is the oldest known concrete bridge span in the state. It consists of two spans of steel girders, resting on concrete abutments and a concrete central pier, with concrete decking. Its guard rails consist of metal piping mounted on concrete piers with simple recessed panels as a decorative effect. The short spans of the bridge demonstrate the unfamiliarity with the use of concrete as a bridge-building material.

The bridge was listed on the National Register of Historic Places in 2014.

See also
North Jackson Street Bridge
Maxwell Street Bridge
National Register of Historic Places listings in Arkansas County, Arkansas
List of bridges on the National Register of Historic Places in Arkansas

References

Road bridges on the National Register of Historic Places in Arkansas
Bridges completed in 1942
1942 establishments in Arkansas
National Register of Historic Places in Arkansas County, Arkansas
Steel bridges in the United States
Girder bridges in the United States
Transportation in Arkansas County, Arkansas
DeWitt, Arkansas